Sara Payne Hayden (August 29, 1919 – March 15, 2019) was one of the women who joined the Women Airforce Service Pilots during World War II. She was the Veterans Affairs chairwoman of the group as of 2006. Hayden died in Plano, Texas in March 2019 at the age of 99.

References

1919 births
2019 deaths
Women Airforce Service Pilots personnel
21st-century American women